The 2015 Oldham Metropolitan Borough Council election took place on 7 May 2015 to elect members of Oldham Metropolitan Borough Council in England. The election took place on the same day as the UK General Election. One third of the Council was up for election and Labour retained control of the Council.

After the election, the composition of the council was

Labour 45
Liberal Democrat 10
Conservative 2
UKIP 2
Independent 1

Election result

Ward results
The electoral division results listed below are based on the changes from the 2014 elections, not taking into account any mid-term by-elections or party defections.

Alexandra ward

Chadderton Central ward

Chadderton North ward

Chadderton South ward

Coldhurst ward

Crompton ward

Failsworth East ward

Failsworth West ward

Hollinwood ward

Medlock Vale ward

Royton North ward

Royton South ward

Saddleworth North ward

Saddleworth South ward

Saddleworth West & Lees ward

Shaw ward

St. James ward

St. Mary's ward

Waterhead ward

Werneth ward

References

2015 English local elections
May 2015 events in the United Kingdom
2015
2010s in Greater Manchester